The knockout stage of the EuroBasket 2017 took place between 9 September and 17 September 2017. All games were played at the Sinan Erdem Dome in Istanbul, Turkey.

Qualified teams

Bracket

All times are local (UTC+3).

Round of 16

Slovenia v Ukraine

Germany v France

Finland v Italy

Lithuania v Greece

Latvia v Montenegro

Serbia v Hungary

Spain v Turkey

Croatia v Russia

Quarterfinals

Germany v Spain

Slovenia v Latvia

Greece v Russia

Italy v Serbia

Semifinals

Spain v Slovenia

Russia v Serbia

Third place game

Final

References

knockout stage
International basketball competitions hosted by Turkey
2017–18 in Turkish basketball
Sports competitions in Istanbul